IDignity is a non-profit organization based in Downtown Orlando that helps homeless and disadvantaged citizens acquire the legal documentation required by the Real ID Act to obtain an identification card. Since its founding and first monthly Identification Clinic in May 2008, IDignity has assisted more than 22,500 individuals in regaining their identification documents.

IDignity was founded, and receives continued support from, five downtown churches in Orlando: The Cathedral Church of St. Luke, First Presbyterian Church of Orlando, First United Methodist Church of Orlando, St. James Cathedral in Orlando, and Trinity Lutheran Church. This project developed when the Project Homeless Connect realized that being unable to afford identification documents was a common issue among the homeless population. 

IDignity's Executive Director, Michael Dippy, was recognized as the 2011 Central Floridian of the Year for his work with the organization.

In 2019, IDignity's first legal counsel, Jacqueline "Jackie" Dowd, was awarded The Florida Bar Foundation's Jane Elizabeth Curran Distinguished Service Award in recognition of her contributions to increasing access to civil justice for the poor.

References

External links 
 IDignity Website

Non-profit organizations based in Florida
Organizations based in Orlando, Florida
Organizations established in 2007